Future Unseen was the first studio album for visual artist/musician Frankie Death and the music group The Photon Belt, 
originally released on 7 Seater Records (Vocabularinist) in Sydney and Subversive Records in Melbourne, Australia in March, 1998.

Frankie Death and The Photon Belt are separate entities who have collaborated for this "unseen" film soundtrack
.
Recorded at Apollo Studios, North Coburg in Melbourne, Australia. 
It includes contributions by musicians such as Gideon Cozens (Compost, Goat, Buttered Loaf)
, Richie Poate (Dreadnaught) and Brad Herdson (Gerling, Sonic Emotion Explosion, Little Sky).

Geoff Towner, in Revolver Street press, described it as 'acoustic space-folk, hip hop beats and electronic minimalism' saying that 'the production has a 70's T-Rex feel'.

A video clip was made by Simon Castelow (Sidesign) for the track 'Lovekult' and broadcast on ABCs' music video program rage on 8 May 1998.

Structure
Future Unseen 'is structured so that instrumental "photon beltish" soundscapes alternate in sequence with the vocal-featuring "Frankie Deathish" tracks'. The tracks alternate between the ambiguous beats and intricately textured electronic soundscapes of the Photon Belt, and the  metaphysical confessional of frankie death's acoustic based songs. 'And it does certainly seem that the band was conscious of song placement ensuring the flow and smooth transition from one track to the next'.

Track listing
 "Rending The Veil" (intro) - 1:40
 "Future Unseen" - 3:38
 "Dream Sequence I (In Search of a New Reality)" - 1:45
 "Caught Between" - 4:16
 "Dream Sequence II (Imbroglio Sabbatical)" - 5:53
 "Lovekult" - 2:35
 "I Am (Hum Chant)" - 1:36
 "Garden Seed (D.N.A. Song)" - 3:14
 "Can You Get My Plane?" - 5:56
 "Face The Music (Sometime)" - 5:12
 "Recurring Theme" - 1:15
 "Guided (Conclusion)" - 3:57
 "Secret Track" - 3:00

Song information
A sample from a recording of Symphonie Fantastique by Hector Berlioz can be heard at the beginning of "Garden Seed". Also random samples from the 1965 film Simon of the Desert directed by Luis Buñuel, can be heard in "Dream Sequence I" and "Dream Sequence II".

Personnel
Frankie Death - Vocals, guitar, percussion, keyboards, drums
Evil Ernie - Synthesizers, bass, vocals, percussion
Gideon Cozens - Bass
Richie Poate - Electric guitar
Brad Herdson - Electric guitar
Jeremy Dullard -  Vibraphone
Mathew Harrod - Drums
Sam Morgan - Percussion
Adam Simmons - Saxophone

also featured the voice of Blake Tholen-Gray aged 5.

Technical personnel
 Ernie Oppenheimer - Executive Producer
 Richie Poate - Assistant Engineer
 James Vincent - Mastering
 Ernie Oppenheimer - Mixing
 Mathew Harrod - Graphic Design
 Frankie Death - Lyricist, Producer, Artwork

Reviews

Future Unseen
This is an incredibly original album!

Think late-60s/early 70s Pink Floyd psychedelia mixed with the funky elements of the Beastie Boys, a hint of early-80s Adam Ant gothic-pirate gun-ho-spirit, childhood dreamlike memories and you'll get something close to what this is....Overall, a wonderfully great album that takes many listens to fully appreciate. There is so much in it! Sadly though, I think it may be largely overlooked by the music press as a) it's an underground release; and b) it doesn't fit neatly into any established genres. Actually, they make new ones.

... huge noise soundscapes...

A strangled, intergalactic kind of folk stuff (listening is understanding, you see).

A wild ride into the cosmic and chaotic.

Melbournian collective's magnum opus.

" This recording is something of an uniquity within the context of Australian independent music...'Future Unseen' is  a grandiose, layered project. The album is decidedly "psychedelic" in feel and conceptual in execution."

Lovekult
"Lovekult" just bubbles under until it reaches the chorus and blows up!..The singer sounds like Brett Anderson from Suede. The song itself is a cross between T Rex and Jesus Jones.
I love the way they introduce the song, with a little kid saying "Presenting Frankie Death and The Photon Belt!".
The next song I enjoyed is the extremely cheesy "Lovekult"...It reminds me a bit of "Very Groovy boots" by the Electric Hellfire Club. Not particularly industrial or gothic but I don't think it is meant to be. Enjoyable as a tongue-in-cheek novelty song.

References

Notes
 Revolver, 20 July 1998, "The Frankie From Outta Space", Sydney
  Kranitz, Jerry, "Soundtrack for the Film Future Unseen", www.Aural-innovations.com, 14 Jan 2001
 Revolver, 10 August 1998, Geoff Towner, "Trip Wire - Album Reviews", Sydney, p. 18
 Citizen, J, "Soundtrack for the Film Future Unseen", www.Blatantpropaganda.org, 1999 (retrieved on 1 May 2011)
 Auto Reverse, Issue 10, Spring, 2000, Ian C Stewart, "Frankie Death and The Photon Belt CD"
Revolver, 19 June 2000, Craig New, "The Stinking Badger & Death", Sydney, p. 42

External links 
Video Clip for the single 'Lovekult', produced by Simon Castelow.
National Library of Australia - Trove : Future Unseen

1998 albums